Edward Hall Moore (November 19, 1871September 2, 1950) was a United States senator from Oklahoma from 1943 to 1949.

Early years
Born on a farm near Maryville, Missouri, Moore attended the public schools and Chillicothe Normal School, where he graduated in 1892. He taught school in Nodaway, Atchinson, and Jackson Counties. Supposedly because he liked to listen to and deliver speeches, he enrolled in the Kansas City School of Law, and graduated in 1900. He was admitted to the Missouri bar in 1901 and began practice in Maryville; he moved shortly thereafter to Okmulgee,  where he became city attorney. He returned to Missouri in 1905 to marry Cora McComb, whom he had met at Chillicothe. They came back to Okmulgee, where Edward practiced law until 1919. Meanwhile, he had begun investing in real estate.  By 1919, he had grown tired of the law, so he sold his practice to enter the oil business. He would become an oil producer, farmer, and cattle raiser.

As a wildcatter, he first struck oil in the Holmes Field of Okfuskee County, Oklahoma. He formed the Independent Oil & Gas Company, with himself as president, he expanded into Kansas and Texas. The estimated value of his company was between $25 million and $40 million by 1930, when he sold it to Phillips Petroleum Company. He formed another oil company, E. H. Moore, Inc. in 1932. This entity had more than 400 wells in Oklahoma, Kansas, Texas, and California before he sold it in 1941. Two years later, he sold the cattle operation.

Political activity
Originally, Moore's political views aligned with the Democratic party, but he became disillusioned with Roosevelt's New Deal during the 1930s. When Roosevelt announced that he would run for a third-term, Moore campaigned vigorously for the Republican candidate, Wendell Willkie. Despite Willkie's loss of the 1940 election, Moore joined the Republican party. W. B. Pine, the Republican nominee for Senate, had just died, and Josh Lee, the Democratic incumbent was popular. Someone proposed Moore as the replacement, to the delight of Republican higher-ups. Not only did Moore hate the New Deal, but he was wealthy enough to finance his own campaign. It worked.

Moore was elected as a Republican to the U.S. Senate in 1942 and served from January 3, 1943, to January 3, 1949; he was not a candidate for renomination in 1948, and retired from public life and political activities. While in the Senate, he was a reliable anti-New Deal vote, but he was more in favor of international involvement than most Republicans. Nonetheless, in 1945, Moore was among the seven senators who opposed full United States entry into the United Nations. He voted in favor of almost all military spending and against all spending for public improvements, including projects slated for Oklahoma. Unsurprisingly he supported programs that would benefit the oil industry. In 1948, he was voted into the Oklahoma Hall of Fame, when he was lauded as a "...statesman and philanthropist."

Death
He died in Tulsa on September 2, 1950, and was interred in Okmulgee Cemetery.

Notes

References

1871 births
1950 deaths
American businesspeople in the oil industry
People from Maryville, Missouri
People from Okmulgee, Oklahoma
University of Missouri–Kansas City alumni
Missouri lawyers
Oklahoma lawyers
Republican Party United States senators from Oklahoma
Oklahoma Republicans